"Kiss Me More" is a song by American rapper and singer Doja Cat featuring fellow American singer SZA from the former's third studio album Planet Her (2021). The song was released on April 9, 2021 as its lead single through Kemosabe and RCA Records. It was written by the artists alongside Stephen Kipner, Terry Shaddick, Carter Lang, and Yeti Beats, with the latter serving as producer along with Rogét Chahayed and additional production from Lang and Tizhimself. It has been described as a disco-influenced pop song.

As it interpolates the melody of the chorus from English-Australian singer Olivia Newton-John's 1981 single "Physical", additional co-writing credits on the track go to Steve Kipner and Terry Shaddick. "Kiss Me More" became a number-one song in New Zealand, Mexico, Malaysia and Singapore, and reached the top-five in eighteen countries including Canada, the United Kingdom, Australia and the United States. She reach the top ten in India and Hungary, top twenty in Portugal, top thirty in France and Slovakia and top forty in Brazil and Germany.  It is the longest running all-female top 10 hit in the latter's history. The song won the Grammy Award for Best Pop Duo/Group Performance (becoming both Doja and SZA's first Grammy wins) and was also nominated for Record of the Year and Song of the Year.

Background
Doja Cat released her second studio album, Hot Pink, in November 2019. The album spawned seven singles, including "Juicy", "Say So", and "Streets". "Juicy" gave Doja Cat her first entry into Billboard US Hot 100 chart. It then went viral on the video-hosting application TikTok, where it served as background music for several Internet dance challenge clips. Aided by their popularity in TikTok, "Say So" and "Streets" became her first songs to top the US Hot 100 and reach the top 10 of the Billboard Global 200, respectively.

Looking back at the success of Hot Pink, staff writers at Billboard observed that Doja Cat had the "innate ability" to produce hit singles, and argued that she was becoming the "quintessential [Generation] Z pop star". After the album had performed well on the charts, the senior staff at Doja Cat's record label, RCA, believed that they needed to release a good follow-up song that would attain Internet-driven commercial success just like her previous singles. Such a song turned out to be "Kiss Me More", featuring American singer SZA.

In early January 2021, Doja Cat revealed that her upcoming studio album features numerous guest appearances, including SZA. On March 5, 2021, SZA first mentioned "Kiss Me More" during an interview with V. She revealed that the song was "a different strut and I'm just excited", while Doja Cat replied by praising SZA, saying "I commend artists, like you, who stick to something". On April 8, 2021, Doja Cat took to social media to reveal the cover art and announce the release of the song for April 9. In an interview with Zane Lowe for Apple Music, she said: "I wanted to make a song about kissing. I just thought it would be cute. That doesn't happen too often, but just a song that's solely about kissing."

Composition
"Kiss Me More" is a pop, pop rap, bubblegum pop, dance-pop and R&B song largely influenced by disco. It is composed in  time and the key of A-flat major, with a moderately fast tempo of 111 beats per minute (BPM) and a chord progression of B♭m7–E♭7–A♭maj7–D♭maj7. Doja Cat opens the song with vocals that recall "the gentle airiness of a light breeze", before two crashes of cymbals "act like glue" as they precede the beat drop. The song is "bolstered" by a "sunny, glimmering riff" and both singing and rap verses which critics noted to spotlight Doja Cat as equal parts singer and rapper. It is distinguishable by its slightly distorted signature guitar lead. Lyrical themes include "romance, passion, bold sexual desires, and tenderness all at once". The song's chorus interpolates the melody from Olivia Newton-John's "Physical", to which songwriters Steve Kipner and Terry Shaddick are also credited as co-writers.

Critical reception
"Kiss Me More" received critical acclaim. Some critics drew resemblance between the song and Doja Cat's breakthrough 2020 hit "Say So". Jon Caramanica of The New York Times wrote that it "mixes the breeze of lite 1980s funk with the bawdiness of 2020s hip-hop, a juggling act that Doja Cat has pioneered, if not trademarked, by now." Justin Cutro of Vulture described it as "a silky, playful R&B jam", while writers at Rolling Stone deemed it a "groovy, disco-inflected jam".  Heran Mamo of Billboard wrote that "the slinky, sensual jam will definitely be a summer playlist staple with its groovy bass line". Writing for Nylon, Steffanee Wang described the song as "a mid-tempo pop number with guitar and sticky melodies". Writing for Teen Vogue, Claire Dodson described the song as "excellent" and "a shimmering ode to kissing [...] with a somewhat melancholy underlying melody that contrasts well with that signature soft-disco Doja beat." Anders Hare of Rated R&B wrote that the "sunkissed, bouncy tune [...] features both musical prowesses sensually crooning about embracing the now with their significant others." Doja Cat and SZA's vocals were described as "smooth", "sultry" and "evocative". Jason Lipshutz of Billboard praised the duo's delivery and noted that they "keep their rhymes tight and chorus vocals breathy, but don't mince words". Both the song and its accompanying music video received all-round praise for its dreaminess and sensuality.

Complex ranked "Kiss Me More" seventh on its mid-year list of the best songs of 2021 and named it one of the most "infectious" songs of the year. Describing it as "light and uptempo" and deeming it "a masterclass in disco-adjacent pop music", they praised Doja Cat's "terrific job balancing singing and rapping over a catchy riff" with her "snappy flow" and "tongue-in-cheek punchlines". Insider crowned "Kiss Me More" the best song on Planet Her and hailed it as "easily one of the best songs released [in 2021]" since "every moment of this song is disarming and brilliant." Brandon Yu of Mic deemed it "the most refined showcase of her many talents thus far". In an album review for Consequence, Carys Anderson agreed that the song "sums up every layer of Doja Cat’s complex celebrity" with its infectious guitar line and chanted refrain, ultimately making it "a summery summation" of the "hyper-feminine, hyper-sexual, hyper-futuristic aesthetic" of Planet Her.

Accolades

Rankings
"Kiss Me More" appeared on many mid-year best-of lists, with several critics identifying it as one best songs of the year so far. The following is a selected list of publications.

Industry awards

Music video

The music video was filmed throughout the week of March 15-19, 2021, directed by Warren Fu. It premiered the same day as the single. It features an astronaut (played by American actor Alex Landi) who crash-lands and explores the fictional "Planet Her", where Doja Cat and SZA portray seductive aliens who "provide soulful ambiance to his journey." At the end, he wakes up in a glass tube displayed among a collection of other men who have tried to explore the planet before him.

Emlyn Travis of MTV praised the music video, describing Planet Her as "a mysterious, flourishing world filled with glittering oases, calming zen gardens, pastel sunset skies, and blossoming cherry trees that is ruled by two larger-than-life queens". Meaghan Garvey of Billboard noted that the video is "bathed in pastel hues and high-femme futurism, and while it's over-the-top sexy, it still ends with Doja and SZA cracking each other up while playing a video game in a galaxy far, far away. " Erica Gonzales of Harper's Bazaar described the video as a "fantastical" one that "only their creative minds could pull off." Jem Aswad of Variety deemed it "trippy", while Jackson Langford of NME described it as "sensual sci-fi". Mekishana Pierre of Entertainment Tonight noted that it was "as playful and sugary-sweet as the track itself". Trishna Rikhy of V wrote: "A celestial visual and sonic experience, the hints of surrealism Doja Cat constantly threads through her videos still lingers". John Wohlmacher of Beats Per Minute noted that the fact that these "playful goddesses" were more interested in videogames than men shows just how clever the thematic approach to Planet Her was.

Live performances
Doja Cat performed a solo version of "Kiss Me More" for the first time at Triller's inaugural Fight Club event in April 2021. Doja Cat and SZA performed the song together at the 2021 Billboard Music Awards in May 2021. Doja Cat again performed a solo version of the song within a medley at the 2021 iHeartRadio Music Awards later that month. During a solo virtual concert as part of American Express's "Unstaged" campaign, SZA performed her verse from the song as well as the chorus usually sung by Doja Cat. She performed it in the same manner during a solo virtual concert as part of Grey Goose's "In Dream" campaign.

Credits and personnel
Credits adapted from Tidal and the Planet Her liner notes.

 Doja Cat – lead vocals, songwriting
 SZA – featured artist, songwriting
 Yeti Beats – songwriting, production
 Rogét Chahayed – songwriting, production
 Tizhimself – songwriting, additional production
 Carter Lang – songwriting, additional production
 Lukasz Gottwald – songwriting
 Stephen Kipner – songwriting, interpolation
 Terry Shaddick – songwriting, interpolation
 Joe Visciano – engineering
 John Hanes – engineering
 Serban Ghenea – mixing
 Mike Bozzi – mastering
 Chad Knight – cover art

Charts

Weekly charts

Year-end charts

Certifications

Remix 

On July 22, 2022, Sony Music Japan announced a remix of "Kiss Me More" was released to digital stores, with Japanese comedian Naomi Watanabe replacing SZA as a featured artist. The remix was produced by Kentaro Fuji with Japanese lyrics and vocal direction by Japanese rapper Awich. The remix was Watanabe's second official music recording, her previous being "Kira Kira" with Japanese-American singer Ai in 2017.

Credits and personnel 
Credits adapted from Tidal and official release page.

 Doja Cat – lead vocals, songwriting
 Naomi Watanabe – featured artist
 SZA – songwriting
 Yeti Beats – songwriting, production
 Rogét Chahayed – songwriting, production
 Tizhimself – songwriting, additional production
 Carter Lang – songwriting, additional production
 Lukasz Gottwald – songwriting
 Stephen Kipner – songwriting, interpolation
 Terry Shaddick – songwriting, interpolation
 Joe Visciano –  engineering
 John Hanes – engineering
 Llyod "2Fly" Mizell – engineering
 Chris Gehringer – mastering
 Serban Ghenea – mixing
 Akiko Urasaki – translation, vocal direction
 Shimi – mixing
 Kenta Yonesaka – vocal recording
 Sora Aota – cover art
 Kentaro Fuji – remixing

Charts

Release history

References

2021 singles
2021 songs
Bubblegum pop songs
Doja Cat songs
Kemosabe Records singles
Number-one singles in Malaysia
Number-one singles in New Zealand
Number-one singles in Singapore
RCA Records singles
SZA songs
Songs written by SZA
Songs written by Doja Cat
Songs written by Rogét Chahayed
Songs written by Steve Kipner
Song recordings produced by Yeti Beats
Songs about kissing
Songs written by Dr. Luke
Music videos directed by Warren Fu
Pop songs
Dance-pop songs
Pop-rap songs
Grammy Award for Best Pop Duo/Group Performance